Chulkov is a Russian masculine surname, its feminine counterpart is Chulkova. Notable people with the name include:
Anastasia Chulkova (born 1985), Russian racing cyclist
Georgy Chulkov (1879–1939), Russian poet, editor, writer and critic
Maksim Chulkov (born 1988), Russian acrobatic gymnast

Russian-language surnames